Koochiching County is a county in the U.S. state of Minnesota. As of the 2020 census, the population was 12,062. Its county seat is International Falls. A portion of the Bois Forte Indian Reservation is in the county. A small part of Voyageurs National Park extends into its boundary, with Lake of the Woods County to its northwest.

History
About 10,000 years ago almost 90% of Koochiching County was covered by Lake Agassiz. When it receded it left low areas of decayed vegetation (muskeg); as a result, three-quarters of northern Koochiching are underlain with 2 to 50 feet of peat.

The name "Koochiching" comes from either the Ojibwe word Gojijiing or Cree Kocicīhk (recorded in some documents as "Ouchichiq"), both meaning "at the place of inlets," referring to the neighboring Rainy Lake and River. Reverend J.A. Gilfillan recorded their meaning, "according to some, Neighbor lake, according to others a lake somewhere," possibly referring to the neighbouring Rainy Lake and to Lake Couchiching located in southern Ontario. Early European (French) inhabitants gave the names Lac à la Pluie (Rainy Lake) and Rivière à la Pluie (Rainy River) to the nearby bodies of water because of the mist-like rain present at the falls of Rainy River and then to the settlement that became known as International Falls.

European settlers in Koochiching County were of many occupations. They were explorers, traders, homesteaders, and lumberjacks. They also were teachers, preachers, merchants, engineers, and builders of industry. Settlers came at the beginning of the 1900s and suffered through isolation, illness, harsh weather, and poverty. They built schools, churches, and good roads.

Koochiching County is the second largest county in area next to Saint Louis County. It is also one of the youngest counties in the state having been created in 1906 after it was separated from Itasca County.

Geography

Koochiching County lies on the northern edge of Minnesota. Its northern border abuts the south border of Canada (across the Rainy River). The Rainy River flows west-northwestward along its north border, being fed by several rivers which drain from the county into the Rainy: Rat Root River drains the east central part of the county; Little Fork River flows northward through the eastern part of the county; Big Fork River flows northward through the east-central part of the county; Black River flows northward through the central part of the county; Rapid River and East Fork Rapid River flow north-northwestward through the western part of the county, joining in the northwestern part of the county shortly before exiting the county's west line to discharge into the Rainy, just west of the county's northwestern corner.

The county terrain consists of low rolling hills, with swampy areas where Lake Agassiz basin was deepest. There are also deposits of peat from 1½ to 50 feet in the low areas. The fairly level soil is broken by ledges of precambrian rock. Bedrock in the area includes Ely greenstone and greenstone schists that are said to be among the oldest on the planet. The terrain slopes to the north, with its highest point on the western part of its southern border at 1,515' (462m) ASL. It is the second-largest county in Minnesota by land area and third-largest by total area.

Major highways

  U.S. Highway 53
  U.S. Highway 71
  Minnesota State Highway 1
  Minnesota State Highway 6
  Minnesota State Highway 11
  Minnesota State Highway 46
  Minnesota State Highway 65
  Minnesota State Highway 217

Adjacent counties

 Rainy River District, Ontario - north
 Saint Louis County - east
 Itasca County - south
 Beltrami County - southwest
 Lake of the Woods County - northwest

Protected areas

 East Rat Root River Scientific and Natural Area
 Lost River Peatland Scientific and Natural Area
 Myrtle Lake Peatland Scientific and Natural Area
 Pine Island State Forest
 Smoky Bear State Forest
 South Black River Peatland Scientific and Natural Area
 Superior National Forest (part)
 Voyageurs National Park (part)

Lakes

 Bartlett Lake
 Battle Lake
 Cameron Lake
 Clear Lake
 Dark Lake
 Franklin Lake
 Larson Lake
 Little Constance Lake
 Little Lake
 Lost Lake
 Moose Lake
 Myrtle Lake
 Nett Lake (part)
 Pine Lake
 Pocquette Lake
 Rainy Lake (part)
 Rat Root Lake
 Seretha Lake
 Silversack Lake
 Teufer Lake

Demographics

2000 census
As of the 2000 census, there were 14,355 people, 6,040 households, and 3,962 families in the county. The population density was 4.62/sqmi (1.79/km2). There were 7,719 housing units at an average density of 2.49/sqmi (0.96/km2). The racial makeup of the county was 96.12% White, 0.19% Black or African American, 2.15% Native American, 0.17% Asian, 0.06% Pacific Islander, 0.08% from other races, and 1.23% from two or more races.  0.56% of the population were Hispanic or Latino of any race. 21.2% were of Norwegian, 19.8% German, 12.3% Swedish and 7.0% Irish ancestry.

There were 6,040 households, out of which 28.40% had children under the age of 18 living with them, 53.30% were married couples living together, 8.50% had a female householder with no husband present, and 34.40% were non-families. 30.40% of all households were made up of individuals, and 14.50% had someone living alone who was 65 years of age or older. The average household size was 2.33 and the average family size was 2.88.

The county population contained 23.90% under the age of 18, 6.40% from 18 to 24, 25.80% from 25 to 44, 26.00% from 45 to 64, and 18.00% who were 65 years of age or older. The median age was 42 years. For every 100 females there were 98.50 males. For every 100 females age 18 and over, there were 95.20 males.

The median income for a household in the county was $36,262, and the median income for a family was $43,608. Males had a median income of $40,642 versus $22,261 for females. The per capita income for the county was $19,167.  About 8.40% of families and 12.10% of the population were below the poverty line, including 16.10% of those under age 18 and 13.40% of those age 65 or over.

2020 Census

Government and politics
From 1932 through 1996, Koochiching County voters tended Democratic, selecting the Democratic nominee in every election save Nixon's 1972 landslide. In 2000, George W. Bush became the first Republican to carry the county since 1972, despite narrowly losing the overall national popular vote. It returned to the Democratic column in the subsequent three elections, although none of the Democratic nominees in those three elections managed as high a vote share as Mondale in 1984 or Dukakis in 1988. In 2016, Donald Trump became the second Republican since 1972 to carry the county, and carried it again in 2020, with an increased majority—the first time the county has ever voted Republican two elections in a row.

Communities
Koochiching County is unique in Minnesota, in the sense that there are no organized civil township governments within the county, due to legislative action taken by the county to absorb existing township governments. Survey townships, as defined by the Public Land Survey System exist but are not organized. Six city governments have been created, and the rest of the county consists of unorganized territories and unincorporated communities.

Cities

 Big Falls
 International Falls (county seat; named Koochiching until January 1, 1903)
 Littlefork
 Mizpah
 Northome
 Ranier
 South International Falls (part of International Falls since 1987)

Unorganized territories

 East Koochiching
 Nett Lake
 Northome
 Northwest Koochiching
 Rainy Lake
 South Koochiching

Census-designated place
 Nett Lake (part)

Other unincorporated communities

 Birchdale
 Bramble
 Central
 Craigville
 Ericsburg
 Forest Grove
 Frontier
 Gates Corner
 Gemmell
 Grand Falls
 Indus
 Island View
 Jameson
 Laurel
 Lindford
 Loman
 Manitou
 Margie
 Nakoda
 Pelland
 Pinetop
 Rauch
 Ray
 Silverdale
 Wildwood

Ghost towns

 Border
 Fairland
 Falls Junction
 Rainy Lake City
 Ridge
 The Pines
 Wayland

In popular culture
Koochiching County is the location of the fictional town of Frostbite Falls, the home of the animated characters Rocky and Bullwinkle. Frostbite Falls was probably named in honor of International Falls, since International Falls is often referred to as the nation's icebox.

See also
 Laurel complex
 National Register of Historic Places listings in Koochiching County, Minnesota
 Lake Agassiz Peatlands Natural Area
 Iron Range
 Ernest Oberholtzer

References

External links

 County website
 Minnesota Department of Transportation maps (Southwest, Southeast, Northwest, Northeast)
 Koochiching County Historical Museum (Int'l Falls)

 
Minnesota counties
Minnesota placenames of Native American origin
1906 establishments in Minnesota
Populated places established in 1906